The Slovenia women's national field hockey team represent Slovenia in women's international field hockey competitions and is controlled by the Slovenian Hockey Federation, the governing body for field hockey in Slovenia.

The team competes in the Women's EuroHockey Championship III, the third level of the women's European field hockey championships.

Tournament record

EuroHockey Championship III
2017 – 5th place
2019 – 7th place
2021 – 7th place

See also
Slovenia men's national field hockey team

References

European women's national field hockey teams
National team
Field hockey